Börje Karvonen (14 September 1938 – 7 March 2016) was a Finnish boxer. He competed at the 1960 Summer Olympics and the 1964 Summer Olympics. At the 1964 Summer Olympics, he lost to Arnulfo Torrevillas of the Philippines in the Round of 32.

References

1938 births
2016 deaths
Finnish male boxers
Olympic boxers of Finland
Boxers at the 1960 Summer Olympics
Boxers at the 1964 Summer Olympics
Sportspeople from Helsinki
Bantamweight boxers